Zahra Lachguer (born 8 June 1978) is a Moroccan former track and field athlete who specialised in the 400 metres hurdles. She was the gold medallist in the event at the 2002 African Championships in Athletics.

She has won medals across several disciplines at the Pan Arab Games, including three 400 m hurdles medals, a javelin throw medal and a heptathlon medal. She was a 1999 Pan Arab Games gold medallist in the hurdles.

Lachguer represented Africa at the 2002 IAAF World Cup. She also won a bronze medal at the 2004 African Championships in Athletics.

She has won national titles in the 400 metres sprint, 400 m hurdles, javelin and heptathlon.

International competitions

References

External links

Living people
1978 births
Moroccan female hurdlers
Moroccan female javelin throwers
Moroccan heptathletes
Competitors at the 1999 Summer Universiade
Competitors at the 2003 Summer Universiade
Athletes (track and field) at the 1997 Mediterranean Games
Athletes (track and field) at the 2005 Mediterranean Games
Mediterranean Games competitors for Morocco
20th-century Moroccan women
21st-century Moroccan women